Mossel Bay Yacht and Boat Club, (abbreviated: MBYBC) / Mosselbaai Seiljag- en Bootklub (Afrikaans), established in 1956, was a yacht club in South Africa. It is located in the harbour city of Mossel Bay on the Garden Route in the Western Cape Province.

The club was multi-aquatic for the disciplines of yachting (keelboat, multihull and dinghies), boating (motor yacht/boat leisure and deep sea angling), diving (snorkelling, scuba diving and underwater hockey), rowing (sea/surf kayak), development of the youth and social. This club was well known for some of the yacht racing events as well as deep sea angling events it organises.

On 31 January 2019 the MBYBC was evicted from the premises.

Historical background
Melville Stephens was a prominent role player in the early years of the club. As owner of the then local Marine Hotel, he was also a keen sailor. To launch his Flying Dutchman sailing dinghy "Condor," he approached the South African Railways to hire the present site. As this was not possible for a private person, the bar of the hotel provided a club membership of eight persons. This consisted of himself, the barman Tommy Meek, Dan van der Merwe, Mo Taggart, Basil Saayman and a stranger by the name of Owen Harris. The member list and the Table Bay Yacht Club constitution was submitted and thus the birth of the Mossel Bay Yacht Club. Stephens initially took it on himself to pay the lease and develop the site. The 'accidentally damaged' storm culvert under the railway line was repaired (deepened) to allow a car and trailer and the site in Munro's Bay was prepared for its launching ramp. A gear shed became the first structure, which was extended with a garage for his Flying Dutchman with the mast down.

The date 24 September 1956 saw the first official member meeting where it was decided that the Club will function in close co-operation with the Harbor Administration and embrace all types of sailing craft. Membership shall be open to Mossel Bay, George, Oudtshoorn and Knysna. C.H Shepherd was elected the first commodore, Dr P Johnson the vice-commodore, A. de Villiers the rear-commodore and M. Stephens the secretary-treasurer. A. Meek assisted in drafting the new constitution.

The early sailors sailed with a Dabchick sailing dinghy, self-built in the Blue room, the function room of the Marine Hotel. Stephens obtained plans for the extra sailing dinghy, which was subsequently built and sailed by these enthusiasts. There was not much beach and the rocks made it difficult to expand the facilities. The ramp not always proved to be successful and carrying the sailing dinghy over the rocks and under the railway bridge was quite a mission. With the help of a visiting dredger used to deepen the harbour, the sand was used as landfill to cover the rocks. Over the years, the rocks and sea were claimed and filled to the level of today. A municipal loan secured tarring of the surface and expansion of the building.

Establishment of the Mossel Bay Yacht and Boat Club
The interest towards power boating was growing, and during 1971, a proper slipway was constructed. This was made possible through fundraising, donations, and a contribution from the Mossel Bay Lions Club. The decreasing popularity of sailing at the time hampered the expansion of the club financially. Subsequently, the growing ski boat deep sea angling fraternity was welcomed to the existing facilities, and in 1976 ,the name was officially changed to the Mossel Bay Yacht and Boat Club.

The boating section allowed for continuous updating of the ramp and a major upgrade was done in 1998.

The Marina
In the early days, the bigger yachts were anchored in the bay, but still within the relative safety of the harbour. As the harbour developed, the yachts were anchored individually within the confines of the harbour, and the sailors had to use a rowing boat to get to the shore. Visitors, however, were still on outside swing moorings. In 1995, the dream of the club came true when permission was granted to construct a walk-on mooring facility. Club members that were the driving force of the project were Louis Harris, Peter Lotter, Dr Hannes Meyer, Bill Roos as well as Dr Hannes Nel, Johnny Schaefer, Fritz van Vuuren and Wilhelm von Schütz. The marina is situated in the Mossel Bay Harbour.

Club facilities

A complete rebuilding of the clubhouse was commissioned in 1980. The transformation over the years can be divided in five stages, namely: the shed (1957), single level with parking area (1968), the second level added (1982), the garages and pool room (1989), the deck and undercover braai section (1995). Up until the eviction date (31 January 2019) the facilities housed an office, flat for the manager, toilets and showers, sail storage room, galley, bar, pool table room and committee room. Visitors had access to satellite TV, internet and public card phone.

Yachting
Yachters could round the peninsula towards Vleesbaai (direction Cape Town to the west) and back or towards the next harbour Knysna (direction Port Elizabeth to the east).

Competitions: Club points were sailed every month. The different classes competed on handicap. During the school holidays, competitions were open to visitors. The Round the Island and New Year Regatta were the highlight during December. The club has hosted various inter club, provincial and national sailing events. Classes included the Hobie 14 and 16 catamarans, Dart 18 catamarans, Mosquito 18 catamarans, Optimist dinghy, Laser dinghy, GP14 dinghy.In August 2011, the club made history by hosting the L26 class Lipton Cup for the first time. This was made possible by the Knysna Yacht Club team who won the previous year. The winning team representing the False Bay Yacht Club (Valsbaai) shall host the competition in 2012.

Safety: The club had one official accredited safety officer responsible for the annual craft survey.

Boating
There was both leisure and competitive fishing. A minimum of one monthly deep sea angling competition was held. The Cob Derby (December) and Saltic (March) were two of the main annual angling events with prize money as an added bonus.

The boating section was responsible for their own annual safety survey of the ski boats by qualified accredited South African Deep Sea Angling Association (SADSAA) officers from their own ranks.

Rowing
Coxed four rowing regattas date back as fas as 1877. The aquatic discipline of rowing was not represented by a specific section in the club and the members belonged to the social or other group. This group of enthusiasts was growing though. Members could stow their solo or tandem sea kayak on the premises in a rack. This allowed for easy launching from the boat ramp. Most of the members used the kayak for exercise and fitness, but some did kayak fishing.

Development
The Ccub established a development section for the younger members to embody the practice of good seamanship. Craft are expensive so for that reason the Club tried to provide boats and opportunity especially for underprivileged children as the parent did not have to be a member.
The Club had an accredited world class sail training officer (2010–).

Sailing:
The Club provided sailing boats for teaching purposes. The class available is the Optimist dinghy. They also had the chance to crew on the keel boat class.

Boating:
Youngsters had the opportunity to accompany boat owners on their angling trips. They also had the chance to show their skills during the monthly deep sea angling competitions.

Diving:
Underwater skill was developed in underwater hockey training and competitions. Snorkelling and spearfishing as well as scuba training was part of the curriculum.

Social
Social members are part of most clubs. Not all members want to be actively involved in the sport activities, but the facilities allow for a membership to aid with the financial expenses of the Club.

50th Anniversary
During 2006, Dr. Loftus Heunis compiled a 75-page book named Highlights from a Journey Through Time. The source of the information came from interviews with Melville Stephens and other knowledgeable club members and locals, the MBYBC minutes of meetings, the historical articles in the Mossel Bay Advertiser, the Mossel Bay Post Office Tree Museum Complex and the book A History of the Royal Cape Yacht Club, 1904–1990.

Miscellaneous
The MBYBC has a close relationship with the local National Sea Rescue Institute (NSRI) station 15. Every year, the members are asked to include a donation with their annual subscription fees which is officially handed over during the Annual General Meeting at the end of the financial year. The NSRI does not receive any help from government, and all the members are volunteers. The local NSRI is situated in the Mossel Bay Harbour.

The club's newsletter dates back to 1991 and was edited by the managing team Arrie and Kiki Ihloff until 1995. Club member Ronald Lareman took it over until 2004. That year, the newsletter became the Voicepipe/Spreekbuis.

The Mossel Bay Yacht and Boat Club website was created and launched on 12 October 1997 by Ronald Lareman and managed until 2011. During 2011, the site was changed to a content management site to allow the different sections to update their news and events themselves.

The burgee of the club was re-designed by and registered at the South African Bureau of Heraldry in 1998 by Ronald Lareman. Different depictions of the insignia are used on ties and clothes.

Club member Rob Holden (Dart 18 World championship participant x4) became the official National Training Manager of South African Sailing in 2010.

On 31 January 2019 the MBYBC was evicted from the premises owned by Transnet National Port Authorities.

References

External links 
MBYBC site
Table Bay Yacht Club
National Sea Rescue Institute

Yacht clubs in South Africa
Sailing in South Africa
1956 establishments in South Africa
Diving clubs